EM4 may refer to :

 EM4 Electric Trainset, a Russian multiple unit train carriage 
 EM-4 rifle, an experimental British rifle
 ARC EM4, a model of ARC embedded microprocessor manufactured by the US company Synopsis
 EM-4, a model of farm tractor manufactured by the Greek company Malkotsis
 EM-4, a model of electric mandolin manufactured by the Mid-Missouri Mandolin Company
 EM4 (tube), a designation for a vacuum tube, of dual-sensitivity, Magic Eye type